DYCT-DTV (channel 31) is a television station in Metro Cebu, Philippines, serving as the Visayas flagship of Broadcast Enterprises and Affiliated Media, Inc. The station maintains a transmitter faciility at Babag Hills, Cebu City.

History
It was started as Cinema Television (or CTV-31) in 1993. It was also the first UHF station to be inspired by a movie television. And on year 1997, it had its broadcast rights form E!, an American-cable network channel that features fashion and lifestyle show, which is lately known as E! Philippines. But in the year 2003, RMN decided to cancel its operation to TV network, citing financial constraints and poor ratings.

On July 3, 2011, UHF 31 in Cebu and all RMN TV stations nationwide returned as a test broadcast, as the frequency was occupied by Broadcast Enterprises and Affiliated Media, following the latter was bought up by Bethlehem Holdings, Inc. (funded by Globe Telecom's Group Retirement Fund) from RMN. And then on, it was branded as BEAM Channel 31 and The Game Channel on August 15, 2011. Recently, The Game Channel limited to its broadcast on December 24, 2011, to give way to its new sister station CHASE which it was broadcast in evening block of The Game Channel. Recently, The Game Channel leased its operation on BEAM and transferred its operation to cable, while CHASE remains on this network and took its 24-hour broadcast. Recently, it ended its operation on October 19, 2012.

On September 7, 2012, when they aired 24 on CHASE, an animation signage plugged and written like this:  "Another Jack TV is rising, coming soon on this channel". This was the part of Solar TV Network, Inc. plans to use this channel assignment to air the said network. The network was planned and it was launched as the secondary Jack TV network named Jack City on October 20, 2012. But it lessened its on air limits on free TV to 18 hours a day, due to National Telecommunications Commission's guidelines on free-to-air broadcasters, however it continues broadcasting 24/7 on cable networks. Somehow it ended operations and affiliation partnership with BEAM on September 1, 2014, and was moved to cable networks. BEAM Channel 31 Cebu, along with other BEAM TV stations nationwide was an affiliated with Essentials Broadcasting Network thru TBN Asia and O Shopping (an ABS-CBN-owned shopping network channel).

BEAM TV provincial stations ceased its analog transmission on March 29, 2022 (3 months after BEAM TV 31 Manila closed down its analog signal for the second time on January 1, 2022), as its now fully migrated to digital broadcast permanently. As of March 30, 2022 (a day after its analog shutdown), BEAM TV Digital broadcast started to operate on UHF 31, but still under maintenance as the network still trying to migrate its signal operations which is currently using the digital transmission on UHF 32 in the area. On April 6, 2022, BEAM TV announced launched of PIE, a new channel that co-ownership with ABS-CBN Corporation, Kroma Entertainment and 917Ventures, on May 23, 2022 as the all-new "tradigital" entertainment channel.

Digital television

Digital channels

DYCT-TV currently operates on UHF Channel 31 (575.143 MHz) and is multiplexed into the following subchannels:

Areas of coverage

Primary areas 
 Cebu City
 Cebu

Secondary areas 
 Portion of Bohol
 Portion of Leyte
 Portion of Negros Oriental

BEAM TV stations

References 

Television stations in Cebu City
Television channels and stations established in 1993
Digital television stations in the Philippines